Toos is a Dutch feminine given name (pronounced ). It is a hypocorism of either Catharina (via Cato) or Antonia. Tooske is a diminutive. In the United States it is among several variants of Antonia, including Toni, Tona, Tonia, Tonie, Tony and Tonya, that peaked in poppularity in the 1970s.

People called Toos

Toos Beumer (Catharina Johanna Beumer, born 1947), Dutch swimmer
Toos Faber-de Heer (1929–2020), a Dutch journalist 
 (1915–2004), Dutch originator of the Pieterpad walking route
Toos Roodzant, (Catharina Roodzant, 1896–1999), Dutch chess master
Toos van der Ende (Catharina van der Endeborn, born 1945), Dutch rower
Toos van der Klaauw (Catharina Maria van der Klaauw, 1915–2011), Dutch fencer
Toos van der Valk (born 1931), Dutch kidnapping victim

People called Tooske
Tooske Ragas (Antonia Grietje Ragas-Breugem née Breugem, born 1974), Dutch actress and television host

See also

Too (disambiguation)
Toon (name)
Toos (disambiguation)
Toosa
Toot (disambiguation)
Toots (disambiguation)

Notes

Dutch feminine given names